The Music of Ahmed Abdul-Malik is the third album by double bassist and oud player Ahmed Abdul-Malik featuring performances recorded in 1961 and originally released on the New Jazz label.

Reception

Eugene Chadbourne of Allmusic says "This jazz musician of Sudanese descent  shows up here and there on recording sessions from the '60s, including a stint as a member of Thelonious Monk's combo. He also played oud and took part in a variety of attempts to blend his roots music with jazz, out of which this is one of the most successful".
(Abdul-Malik was actually of Caribbean descent.)

Track listing
All compositions by Ahmed Abdul-Malik except as indicated
 "Nights on Saturn" - 7:25  
 "The Hustlers" - 5:25  
 "Oud Blues" - 4:03  
 "La Ikbey" - 5:44  
 "Don't Blame Me" (Jimmy McHugh, Dorothy Fields) - 7:14  
 "Hannibal's Carnivals" - 4:35

Personnel
Ahmed Abdul-Malik - bass, oud
Tommy Turrentine - trumpet
Bilal Abdurrahman - clarinet, percussion
Eric Dixon - tenor saxophone
Calo Scott - cello
Andrew Cyrille - drums

References

New Jazz Records albums
Ahmed Abdul-Malik albums
1961 albums
Albums recorded at Van Gelder Studio
Albums produced by Esmond Edwards